Maggie Borg (1952–2004) was a Maltese activist for environmental and social rights.

Environmental activist
Maggie Borg was a prominent Maltese environmentalist. She worked for Friends of the Earth (Malta) and Greenpeace Mediterranean. Her main objectives were the promotion of recycling and clean energy in Malta and the Mediterranean countries, and the preservation of nature in rural areas. Borg worked together with other notable Maltese activists such as Julian Manduca, who had an award named after him. Maltese rock band Dripht dedicated their album Global Warning to both environmentalists.

Biography
Maggie Borg was born in Cospicua, Malta on 14 January 1952. She was the eldest daughter in a family of 10 siblings. After an education at Cospicua Public School she worked as a tourist guide, a shop assistant and as a self-employed designer and manufacturer of woolen sweaters before joining Greenpeace. Borg married at a young age. After the marriage broke up she became very supportive of friends and younger members of the family. 
Borg resided in Naxxar and Mosta and finally settled down in Zebbug. She continued her education as a mature student at the University of Malta where she earned a master's degree in Sociology & Environmental Studies in 1993. She developed a course in environmental studies for the secondary school curriculum and started teaching senior classes at San Anton School. Her approach to teaching was appreciated by pupils and parents alike.  Quoting Malta Independent columnist Daphne Caruana Galizia: "Her methods were considered unorthodox until her pupils began scoring 1s and 2s in their MATSEC exams."

Death
Maggie Borg died of breast cancer on 3 August 2004, aged 52, after fighting the disease for almost ten years. She remained active until the end supporting various causes, like the Malta Cancer Foundation. Her name is remembered annually on the website Aboutmalta.com on the anniversary of her death.

References

1952 births
2004 deaths
Deaths from breast cancer
Friends of the Earth
Maltese environmentalists
Maltese women environmentalists
People associated with Greenpeace
20th-century Maltese people
21st-century Maltese people
20th-century Maltese women
21st-century Maltese women